Two-time defending champion Rafael Nadal defeated Fernando González in the final, 6–2, 6–2 to win the men's singles tennis title at the 2007 Italian Open.

Seeds
A champion seed is indicated in bold text while text in italics indicates the round in which that seed was eliminated. The top eight seeds received a bye into the second round.

  Roger Federer (third round)
  Rafael Nadal (champion)
  Andy Roddick (third round)
  Nikolay Davydenko (semifinals)
  Novak Djokovic (quarterfinals)
  Fernando González (final)
  Tommy Robredo (quarterfinals)
  Ivan Ljubičić (second round)
  James Blake (third round)
  Andy Murray (first round)
  Tommy Haas (first round)
  Tomáš Berdych (quarterfinals)
  Richard Gasquet (second round)
  David Ferrer (first round)
  Mikhail Youzhny (third round)
  Juan Carlos Ferrero (second round)

Draw

Finals

Section 1

Section 2

Section 3

Section 4

Qualifying

Qualifying seeds

Qualifiers

Qualifying draw

First qualifier

Second qualifier

Third qualifier

Fourth qualifier

Fifth qualifier

Sixth qualifier

Seventh qualifier

See also
List of tennis tournaments

References

External links
2007 Internazionali BNL d'Italia Singles draw
2007 Internazionali BNL d'Italia Singles Qualifying draw
ITF tournament profile

Men's Singles
Italian Open - Singles